Bray Wanderers Football Club are an Irish association football club playing in the League of Ireland First Division. The club in its present form was founded in 1942 in Bray, and was known until 2010 as Bray Wanderers A.F.C. It was elected to the league in 1985, and plays its home matches at the Carlisle Grounds. The club's colours are green and white, and it goes by the nickname The Seagulls.

History

Early Days 
In 1922, some members of St Kevin's Gaelic football club in Bray left the club as a result of a dispute and formed a soccer club called Bray Wanderers. Through the 1930s and 1940s, however, Bray Unknowns were the leading team in the town, playing in the League of Ireland for nineteen seasons from 1924–25 to 1942–43. Bray Wanderers went into decline in the mid-thirties but was reformed in 1942–43 and entered the Athletic Union League Division 3 for the 1943–44 season. By the 1948–49 season Wanderers had reached Division 1 of the AUL but the period in between did not pass without controversy. In 1944 the club reached the Leinster Football Association Shield final but was disqualified for fielding an illegal player in the semi-final. When in Division 2 of the AUL in 1946–47 the club was expelled from the league due to the B team not fulfilling a league fixture, although the club was reinstated the following season. Wanderers won the Junior Cup in 1950-51 and again in 1953–54, defeating Ierne 1–0 in the Final. The following season Wanderers left the AUL and joined the Leinster Senior League.

Mid 1900s 
In 1955–56 Wanderers won the FAI Intermediate Cup, defeating Workmens Club 2–1 in the final. There was also a first appearance in the FAI Cup against Longford Town in 1956. They won the FAI Intermediate Cup again two years later, defeating Chapelizod 2–1 in the final. In 1964–65 they were founder members of the League of Ireland B Division. However they left after just one season and once again went into decline. By 1973 Bray Unknowns were playing in the LSL and the management changed the name to Bray Wanderers in a partially successful effort to amalgamate the two.

League of Ireland 
Bray Wanderers were elected to the League of Ireland when it was expanded to two Divisions for the 1985–86 season. They played their first game as a League of Ireland club on 8 September 1985 in a FAI League Cup match against Dundalk with Jim Mahon scoring the club's first goal at senior level. The Wanderers' secured promotion to the Premier Division by winning the League of Ireland First Division Championship that year. They were relegated back down to the First Division in the 1987–88 season. Wanderers did not regain Premier Division status until the 1990–91 season but had their first major success during their spell in the First Division. They won the FAI Cup in 1990 beating St Francis 3–0 in the first Lansdowne Road final with John Ryan becoming only the second player to score a hat-trick in a FAI Cup final. They made history by becoming the first ever First Division side to win the trophy. Due to this cup win, Wanderers competed in European competition, for the first time in their history in the 1990–91 season. They were defeated, however, by Trabzonspor in the European Cup Winners' Cup preliminary round.

After two seasons in the Premier Division, the club was once again relegated to the First Division where they remained for three seasons. In 1995–96 season, Wanderers were promoted back to the Premier Division as First Division champions, but were relegated back down in the following season. The next two seasons followed a similar pattern as they went back up and came straight back down. In 1998–99, a season they got relegated again, Wanderers won their second FAI Cup, defeating Finn Harps after two replays which earned them a spot in the 1999-2000 UEFA Cup against a Roy Hodgson led Grasshoppers.

In 1999–00, the club won promotion back to the Premier Division, and in 2000–01 Wanderers achieved their highest ever league finish of 4th place in the Premier Division. The club could not build on this as they were relegated back down in 2002–03 but were once again promoted in 2004. The club was relegated at the end of the 2009 season, but the demise of Cork City F.C. meant they were reinstated to the Premier Division. Finishing in a promotion/relegation play-off in 2010, the club maintained its Premier status following a penalty shoot-out with Monaghan United.

The following season, finishing sixth in the Premier Division, the club gained a place in the all-Ireland Setanta Cup, but early in 2012 conceded home and away matches to Glentoran FC in the first round of the competition (2–4 & 0–3).

In the 2012 season, Bray finished tenth of 12 clubs in the Premier Division, five points above Dundalk, who had to survive a promotion/relegation battle against Waterford United to ensure their survival in the top flight.

In 2013, Bray were again in the relegation mix, and having finished second-last they played First Division promotion play-off winners Longford Town over two legs, winning 5–4 on aggregate.

On 10 January 2014, it was announced that Alan Mathews would be the new manager with Barry O'Connor as his assistant. The club ended the season in tenth place, just one point above UCD, and entered the 2015 season as the fourth-longest surviving Premier Division club.

2015:Five managers in one season
The club had five first team managers in total across the 2015 season. On 1 April 2015, Mathews resigned suddenly, together with the rest of his backroom team, citing a breakdown in communication with the club's new owners: Gerry Mulvey & Denis O'Connor, who had taken over during the off-season. The club appointed Under-19 coach Maciej Tarnogrodzki as interim senior team manager the following day.
The following month, the club announced that former Shamrock Rovers boss Trevor Croly had signed a three-year contract to manage the club.

Just one month later however, Croly also resigned in a similar fashion to Mathews before him. Mick Cooke was brought in to replace him as the fifth manager of the season (including temporary Player/Manager David Cassidy), and Bray finished the 2015 season in 8th position.

2016 - 2021 
In July 2017, after much speculation about the future of the club, majority shareholder and interim chairman Gerry Mulvey released a statement which confirmed that the club was financially stable and outlined big plans for the future of the club. The statement was widely ridiculed, mainly due to its branding of Wicklow County Council as "the North Korea of Ireland for business" after the council's repeated refusal to allow the Carlisle Grounds to be rezoned.

In September 2017, the FAI launched an investigation into alleged match-fixing surrounding Bray Wanderers friendly against Waterford on 8 September 2017. The FAI released a formal statement in February 2018 affirming that no evidence to support any charge had been found.

The 2018 season went badly for Bray, with the club losing 28 of their 36 league matches and exiting every cup competition at the first time of asking. The financial situation was not any better, with players voting to strike due to unpaid wages and medical costs. The players were eventually paid before the strike went ahead. On 26 July 2018, after several weeks of speculation over Bray's future, the club was taken over by St. Joseph's Boys academy director Niall O'Driscoll. Mulvey remained in a minority role. Bray were officially relegated to the League of Ireland First Division in October 2018, ending a 12-year stay in the top flight of Irish football.

Merger with Cabinteely
In November 2021, Bray Wanderers and Cabinteely F.C. announced a merger, technically a takeover of Wanderers by Cabinteely. The newly created team would be known as Bray Wanderers and continue to play in the Carlisle Grounds, with the intention to apply for a First Division licence. Bray's former manager Pat Devlin and then Director of Football (DoF) at Cabinteely became the DoF for the new Bray Wanderers.

Since the merger and Devlin's return to Bray Wanderers, there have been a number of conflicts. Incidents have included Devlin reputedly telling fans not to support the team or attend matches on local radio station East Coast FM, and Devlin and fans engaging in an "ugly exchange" at an away fixture against Wexford FC. Attendances dropped at the Carlisle Grounds as Bray experienced one of the worst seasons in their history, going from a title challenging side to one near the bottom of the table. In mid-2022, club chairman Tony Richardson reportedly stated that the club were "making progress" in "eliminating crowd trouble which [..] marred some of their games this season", and the club stated that it had appointed a "Fan Liaison Officer [..] for dialogue with fans who wish to make their point". A report in the Bray People, after the clubs's eighth home league defeat of the season, referred to a "lack of goals" and a video reputedly showing "people throwing pyrotechnics [..] over the walls of the Carlisle Grounds". With a 5-1 home defeat in Bray's final home game of the 2022 season to Cobh Ramblers, the season ended with a 18.75% win record, among the worst season performances in the club's history. 

In November 2022, former Wexford FC manager Ian Ryan was appointed as head coach, with Devlin remaining as "Head of Football". In March 2023, Bray progressed to the semi-final of the Leinster Senior Cup with a 2-1 victory over reigning League of Ireland Premier Division champions Shamrock Rovers.

Ownership 
The current ownership of the club is as follows:
 51.0% - Niatim Holdings (Tony Richardson)
 41.7% - Milway Dawn (Gerry Mulvey)
 4.9% - Pat Devlin
 2.2% - John Deering
 0.2% - John O'Brien

Supporters 
Up to 2022, Bray Wanderers had a small, but loyal fanbase, with annual average attendances generally around 700–1000 home fans. For away matches the Bray Wanderers Supporters Club organised a bus to run direct to the relevant ground.

In March 2008, the Ultra group of Bray Wanderers fans, "Na Fánaithe", was formed by five members of the supporters club. Unlike similar groups in Dublin, such as "Briogáid Dearg", "SRFC Ultras", "Shed End Invincibles" and "Notorious Boo Boys", Na Fánaithe is a much smaller group.

In July 2022, Bray Wanderers fans formed a new supporters club, the "1985 Seagulls" group.

Honours 
 FAI Cup: 2
 1990, 1999
 League of Ireland First Division: 3
 1985–86, 1995–96, 1999–2000
 League of Ireland First Division Shield: 1
 1995–96
 Leinster Senior League: 3
 1957–58, 1958–59, 1959–60
 FAI Intermediate Cup: 2
 1955–56, 1957–58
 FAI Junior Cup: 2
 1950–51, 1953–54
 Enda McGuill Cup: 1
 2005

Records 
 Record Victory: 7–0 v Cobh Ramblers 17 October 1997, 7–0 v St. Mochta's 2007 FAI Cup, 17 June 2007
 Record League Defeat: 8–1 v Dundalk 4 May 2015
 Most Points in a Season: 72 in 1999–00
 Most League Goals in a Season: 19, Eamon Zayed, 2003
 Most League Goals: 72, Jason Byrne 1998–03, 2012–13

European record

Overview

Matches

Current squad

Technical staff

Managers

Notes

References

External links 

 Bray Wanderers AFC Website
 "'You can't lose, you'll make the league look bad'", RTÉ Sport, 13 May 2020.
 Club profile on Airtricity League site
 Republic of Ireland historical League Tables 1921/2-2006 by Rec.Sport.Soccer Statistics Foundation

 
Association football clubs established in 1942
Association football clubs in County Wicklow
Former Athletic Union League (Dublin) clubs
Former League of Ireland Premier Division clubs
Former Leinster Senior League clubs
League of Ireland B Division clubs
League of Ireland First Division clubs
Wanderers
1942 establishments in Ireland